

Maximilian Ritter von Pohl (15 April 1893 – 26 July 1951) was a general in the Luftwaffe during World War II. He was a recipient of the Knight's Cross of the Iron Cross of Nazi Germany.

Awards and decorations

 Knight's Cross of the Iron Cross on 15 June 1944 as General der Flieger and commanding general of the Luftwaffe in Mittelitalien (central Italy)

References

Sources

 

1893 births
1958 deaths
Military personnel from Munich
Luftwaffe World War II generals
German Army personnel of World War I
Knights of the Military Order of Max Joseph
Recipients of the clasp to the Iron Cross, 1st class
Recipients of the Gold German Cross
Recipients of the Knight's Cross of the Iron Cross
German prisoners of war in World War II held by the United States
People from the Kingdom of Bavaria
Military personnel of Bavaria
20th-century Freikorps personnel
Generals of Aviators